Desmond Bull (13 August 1935 – 4 November 2015) was an Australian cricketer. He played in 68 first-class matches for Queensland between 1956 and 1968.

See also
 List of Queensland first-class cricketers

References

External links
 

1935 births
2015 deaths
Australian cricketers
Queensland cricketers
Cricketers from Brisbane